John Wesley Hanes (February 3, 1850 – September 23, 1903) was an American businessman from Winston-Salem, North Carolina who ran a tobacco company before founding Shamrock Mills in 1901, the company that became Hanes Hosiery Mills.

Life
Known by his middle name, Wesley Hanes (one of Winston-Salem's wealthiest and most influential businessmen) owned the expensive clothing company in partnership with his brother, Pleasant  Henderson Hanes. Using some of the proceeds of their sale of the business to R. J. Reynolds Tobacco Company, Wesley Hanes went into the manufacturing of stockings while his brother set up an underwear manufacturing business under the name P.H. Hanes Knitting Company.

Wesley Hanes died of heart trouble on the morning of September 23, 1903, in Atlantic City N. J,  aged fifty-three, just two years after creating the business. His son, James Gordon Hanes, would be responsible for the 1963 merger with P. H. Hanes Knitting and for making Hanes Hosiery one of largest producers in the world of seamless stretch nylon hosiery for women.

References

1850 births
1903 deaths
American chief executives of manufacturing companies
American tobacco industry executives
American textile industry businesspeople
American chief executives of fashion industry companies
American company founders
Hanes family
Businesspeople from Winston-Salem, North Carolina
R. J. Reynolds Tobacco Company
Burials at Salem Cemetery